Caesium enneabromodibismuthate is an inorganic compound with the formula Cs3Bi2Br9. It is one of the coordination complexes formed by caesium, bismuth and bromine. At room temperature, it is trigonal (Pm1) and it undergoes phase transformation to monoclinic phase (C12/c1) when the temperature is below 96 K.

Preparation
Traditionally, it can be synthesized from a hydrobromic acid solution of stoichiometric amounts of caesium bromide and bismuth hydroxide or bismuth(III) oxide, crystals are formed by cooling the hot, saturated solution. It can also be obtained by reacting cesium bromide and bismuth(III) bromide in DMF, followed by vaporizing the solvent. Its nanocrystals can be synthesized in 1-octadecene at 170 °C using caesium oleate and bismuth(III) bromide as precursors.

References

Caesium compounds
Bismuth compounds
Bromo complexes